is a Japanese light novel series written by Mojikakiya and illustrated by toi8. It began as a web novel that was serialized in the Shōsetsuka ni Narō website from September 2017 to January 2020. It was later acquired by Earth Star Entertainment, who have published eleven volumes from December 2018 to November 2021 under their Earth Star Novel imprint.

A manga adaptation illustrated by Kū Urushibara has been serialized in the Comic Earth Star website since May 2018, with its chapters collected into six tankōbon volumes as of November 2022. An anime television series adaptation has been announced.

Media

Light novel
Written by Mojikakiya, the series began publication online in the Shōsetsuka ni Narō website on September 18, 2017, and ended on January 21, 2020. It was later acquired by Earth Star Entertainment, who have published eleven volumes with illustrations by toi8 from February 15, 2018, to November 16, 2021, under their Earth Star Novel imprint.

In July 2021, J-Novel Club announced that they licensed the novels for English publication.

Manga
A manga adaptation illustrated by Kū Urushibara began serialization on the Comic Earth Star website on May 8, 2018. The first tankōbon volume was released on October 16, 2018. As of November 2022, six volumes have been released.

Anime
An anime television series adaptation was announced on November 1, 2022.

References

External links
  at Shōsetsuka ni Narō 
  
  
 

2018 Japanese novels
Anime and manga based on light novels
Earth Star Entertainment manga
Fantasy anime and manga
J-Novel Club books
Japanese fantasy novels
Japanese webcomics
Light novels
Light novels first published online
Shōnen manga
Shōsetsuka ni Narō
Upcoming anime television series
Webcomics in print